{{DISPLAYTITLE:C9H7NO4}}
The molecular formula C9H7NO4 (molar mass: 193.16 g/mol, exact mass: 193.0375 u) may refer to:

 DHICA
 Dopachrome

Molecular formulas